Calumpit longganisa, also known as longganisang bawang (lit. "garlic longaniza"), is a Filipino pork sausage originating from Calumpit, Bulacan, Philippines. It is a type of de recado longganisa. It is made with lean pork, pork fat, garlic, bay leaves, brown sugar, soy sauce, vinegar, salt, black pepper, paprika, and optionally, chili.

See also
 List of sausages

References

Philippine sausages